Brian Merritt Bergson (born September 4, 1964) was an American politician.

Bergson was born in Minnesota and lived in Osseo, Minnesota. He served in the United States Army and was a businessman. Bergson went to University of Minnesota and studied geography. Bergson served in the Minnesota House of Representatives in 1993 and 1994 and was a Democrat. His great-uncle Leonidas Merritt also served in the Minnesota Legislature.

References

1964 births
Living people
People from Osseo, Minnesota
Military personnel from Minnesota
University of Minnesota alumni
Businesspeople from Minnesota
Democratic Party members of the Minnesota House of Representatives